Hastings County is located in the province of Ontario, Canada. Geographically, it is located on the border of Eastern Ontario and Central Ontario. Hastings County is the second-largest county in Ontario, after Renfrew County, and its county seat is Belleville, which is independent of Hastings County. Hastings County has trademarked the moniker "Cheese Capital of Canada".

Administrative divisions
The 14 local municipalities within Hastings County are:

 Town of Bancroft
 Town of Deseronto
 Municipality of Centre Hastings
 Municipality of Hastings Highlands
 Municipality of Tweed
 Municipality of Marmora and Lake
 Township of Carlow/Mayo
 Township of Faraday
 Township of Limerick
 Township of Madoc
 Township of Stirling-Rawdon
 Township of Tudor and Cashel
 Township of Tyendinaga
 Township of Wollaston

The Tyendinaga Mohawk Territory is within the Hastings census division but is independent of the county. The cities of Belleville and Quinte West are separated municipalities and so are within the geographical boundaries of the county and included in the Hastings census division, but they not under the administration of the county government.

History 
Hastings County (named for Francis Rawdon-Hastings) was first organized for electoral purposes in 1792, with its boundaries described as being:

For the initial elections to the Legislative Assembly of Upper Canada, it was united with Northumberland County and most of Lennox County for purposes of returning one member.

It was situated within the Mecklenburg District, which was later renamed the "Midland District" in 1792.

In 1798, the Parliament of Upper Canada passed legislation to provide, that, at the beginning of 1800:

The territory withdrawn from the County continued to form part of the Midland District.

19th century
In 1821, the newly surveyed townships of Elzevir, Madoc and Marmora were added to the county. While in this time agriculture was the most important industry in Hastings County, by 1822 (when the Marmora Iron Works was approaching its peak production) mining was playing an increasingly more important role in the area's economy.

Prominent citizens of Hastings County and Ameliasburgh Township unsuccessfully petitioned the provincial government for district status during 1817, 1818, 1823 and 1825. After Prince Edward County successfully achieved its own government in 1831, Hastings County continued to send petitions throughout the 30s before finally achieving the status of a separate district in March 1837.

It was constituted as the District of Victoria in 1839 (which continued until its dissolution in 1850). By 1845, the county was declared to consist of the following geographic townships:

 Elzevir
 Grimsthorpe
 Hungerford
 Huntingdon
 Lake
 Marmora
 Madoc
 Rawdon
 Sydney
 Tudor
 Thurlow
 Tyendinaga

Belleville, after an abortive attempt two years previously, was organized as a municipality with its own Board of Police in 1836, and was designated as the district seat in 1837. It was constituted as a town under the Baldwin Act in 1850, and later became a city in 1877.

Edward Fidlar became the first warden of Hastings County with their first meeting on January 28, 1850. By this time the Hastings County Council was also interested in education and the building of the railroad.

On October 27, 1856, the first railroad train arrived in Belleville and by 1864 around 100 people were employed by the railroad.

In August 1866, discovery of gold at Eldorado, near Madoc, caused great excitement throughout Hastings County as people flooded to the area from all over North America. According to Barnes, "gold has been found in twenty-seven locations spread over nine townships."

In 1889 the Belleville Waterworks was created as a private company, which was then bought by the city of Belleville in 1889.

20th century
In 1911, Hastings County was the first in the province to appoint a reforestation committee, which was instrumental in passing laws around county forests. Postal service began in the area in 1913.

By 1927 the original townships had each formed separate governance and many of them had been partitioned due to increase in population and development. The 1927 townships were:

 Bangor
 Carlow
 Cashel
 Dungannon
 Elzevir
 Faraday
 Grimsthorpe
 Herschel
 Hungerford
 Huntingdon
 Lake
 Limerick
 Madoc
 Marmora
 Mayo
 McClure
 Monteagle
 Rawdon
 Sidney
 Thurlow
 Tudor
 Tyendinaga
 Wicklow
 Wollaston

Following World War II, more efficient communication and transportation led a trend toward consolidation of township administrations:
The Township of Carlow/Mayo was formed by amalgamation of the contiguous townships of Carlow and Mayo.
The Township of Wicklow and McClure was formed by amalgamation of the contiguous townships of McClure and Wicklow.
Lake Township and Marmora Township were administered as the Township of Marmora & Lake.
Elzevir Township and Grimsthorpe Township were administered as the Township of Elzevir & Grimsthorpe since before 1968.
The Township of Tudor and Cashel was formed by amalgamation of the geographically non-contiguous townships of Cashel and Tudor.

21st century
At the dawn of the 21st century, there has been a trend toward amalgamating rural and urban administrations. On 1 January 1998:
 The City of Quinte West was formed through amalgamation of the City of Trenton and the Township of Sidney from Hastings County, with the Village of Frankford and the Township of Murray from Northumberland County.
 The Municipality of Centre Hastings was incorporated by amalgamating Huntingdon Township with the Village of Madoc.
 The Township of Stirling-Rawdon was formed through the amalgamation of Rawdon Township with the Village of Stirling.

In 1998, the Village of Tweed was amalgamated with its Township of Hungerford and the contiguous Township of Elzevir & Grimsthorpe to form the Municipality of Tweed. In 1999, the Village of Bancroft merged with Dungannon Township to form the Town of Bancroft.

On 1 January 2001, the Municipality of Hastings Highlands was incorporated by amalgamating the contiguous townships of Bangor, Wicklow & McClure, Herschel and Monteagle. Also in 2001, the Village of Marmora amalgamated with the surrounding townships of Marmora and Lake to form the Municipality of Marmora and Lake.

Demographics

Historic populations:
 Population in 2001: 125,915
 Population in 1996: 126,099

Transportation
The county is served by Highway 401 in the south, Highway 7, a leg of the Trans-Canada Highway, in the central region, Highways 62 and 37 travelling north to south, Highway 28 travelling east to west in the northern region, and Highway 127 travelling north from Maynooth, also in the northern region.

County council 

Following are members of Hastings County Council as of August, 2019:

Warden: Rick Phillips 
Town of Bancroft: Paul Jenkins 
Township of Carlow/Mayo: Bonnie Adams 
Municipality of Centre Hastings: Tom Deline 
Town of Deseronto: Dan Johnston 
Township of Faraday: Dennis Purcell 
Hastings Highlands: Tracy Hagar
Township of Limerick: Carl Stefanski 
Township of Madoc: Loyde Blackburn 
Municipality of Marmora & Lake: Jan O'Neill 
Township of Stirling/Rawdon: Bob Mullin 
Township of Tudor & Cashel: Libby Clarke 
Municipality of Tweed: Jo-Anne Albert 
Township of Tyendinaga: Rick Phillips 
Township of Wollaston: Lynn Kruger

Education

Currently, Hastings & Prince Edward District School Board operates public schools. Previously, Hastings County Board of Education operated public schools.

Emergency Services

There are 5 EMS stations in Hastings County with Hastings-Quinte EMS HQ located in Belleville, Ontario.

See also
 List of municipalities in Ontario
 Southern Ontario
 Eastern Ontario
 Central Ontario
 List of townships in Ontario

References

Further reading
 Boyce, Gerald E. Historic Hastings - Volume One with New Introduction and Expanded Index, Global Heritage Press, Milton, 2013
 Union Publishing Company Farmer's and Business Directory for the Counties of Frontenac, Hastings, Lennox, Addington, Prince Edward for 1899,  Union Publishing Company, Ingersol, 1899 (facsimile reprint by Global Heritage Press, Milton, 2010)
 
 Elizabeth Hancocks and W. E. Britnell Hastings County Marriage Register 1858-69,  Global Heritage Press, Milton, 2005
 June Gibson, Indexed by Elizabeth Hancocks, C. G. & Shannon Hancocks Hastings and Prince Edward County - Surrogate Court Index of Ontario, Canada, 1859-1900 ( Wills)- Second Edition,  Global Heritage Press, Milton, 2005
  Dan Walker and Fawne Stratford-Devai Victoria District Marriage Register 1839-1858 ,  Global Heritage Press, Milton, 2000
 Rolph and Clark, Brian Tackaberry Directory of the County of Hastings 1879 - 1880, Rolph and Clark, 1904 (facsimile reprint with new Introduction and new Index by Global Heritage Press, Milton, 1999)

External links

 
Counties in Ontario